Sikar Medical College, also known as Shri Kalyan Government Medical College is a full-fledged tertiary Medical college in Sikar, Rajasthan, India . The college imparts the degree of Bachelor of Medicine and Surgery (MBBS) & Postgraduate courses. Nursing and para-medical courses are also offered. The college is affiliated to Rajasthan University of Health Sciences and is recognized by Medical Council of India. The selection to the college is done on the basis of merit through National Eligibility and Entrance Test.

Courses
Sikar Medical College undertakes the education and training of students MBBS courses.undertakes education and training of students for MBBS course with an intake of 100 students annually via NEET-UG. It also offers Post-graduate courses recognized by the NBEMS & NMC.
The post-graduate students in various courses of medicine get admitted to Sikar Medical college strictly through all India post-graduate medical entrance examinations i.e. NEET-PG held once every year in January.The much revered Shri Kalyan hospital (S.K.Hospital) is the teaching hospital attached with the medical college.The hospital is the front-runner among Government medical facilities in the district and receives massive inflow of patients from the city and adjoining towns of Sikar district.

References

External links 
 https://education.rajasthan.gov.in/content/raj/education/sikar-medical-college/en/home.html#

2019 establishments in Rajasthan
Affiliates of Rajasthan University of Health Sciences
Educational institutions established in 2019
Medical colleges in Rajasthan